Copelatus imitator is a species of diving beetle. It is part of the genus Copelatus in the subfamily Copelatinae of the family Dytiscidae. It was described by Bilardo & Rocchi in 2002.

References

imitator
Beetles described in 2002